Trypeta zoe, the daisy leafminer, is a species of tephritid or fruit flies in the genus Trypeta of the family Tephritidae.

Foodplants include Achillea species, Artemisia vulgaris, Artemisia absinthium and Leucanthemum vulgare, where larvae form leaf mines.

This species is present in Austria, Belgium, Bulgaria, Croatia, Czech Republic, Denmark, Finland, France, Germany, Great Britain, Hungary, Ireland, Italy, Norway, Poland, Romania, Slovakia, Spain, Sweden, Switzerland and Netherlands.

References

External links
Biolib
Fauna Europaea
Brian Pitkin, Willem Ellis, Colin Plant and Rob Edmunds The leaf and stem mines of British flies

zoe